Ashokan is an Indian actor known for his roles in Malayalam films. He made his film debut with Peruvazhiyambalam the film won the 1979 National film award for best feature film. He is best known for his roles in Yavanika (1982), Yuvajanotsavam (1986), Thoovanathumbikal (1987), Moonnam Pakkam (1988), In Harihar Nagar (1990), Amaram (1990) and 2 Harihar Nagar (2009).

Career

He made his debut in 1979 in Peruvazhiyambalam, directed by Padmarajan, where he played a 15-year-old boy who becomes a fugitive after killing a bully. This was followed by roles in Padmarajan's films Arappatta Kettiya Gramathil (1986), Thoovanathumbikal (1987) and Moonnam Pakkam (1988). He had the lead role in Anantaram, a film by Adoor Gopalakrishnan.

Personal life 

Ashokan was born as the youngest among the four children to (both late) Samudayathil N. P. Unnithan and Azhakath Savithri on 23 May 1961 at Chingoli, Haripad. His father was a public prosecutor at CBI and his mother was a housewife. He lost his father when he was young and was brought up by his mother. Ashokan completed his basic education at Chingoli L.P. School, Chingoli, Upper Primary Education completed in PMDUPS, Cheppad, and High School at St. Thomas H. S. Karthikapally. He graduated in Arts from T. K. Madhava Memorial College, Nangiarkulangara, Haripad. He was studying for his pre-degree first year when he was offered a role in Peruvazhiyambalam.

He is married to Sreeja and has a daughter, Karthiyayani. They currently reside in Chennai.

Filmography

1970s

1980s

1990s

2000s

2010s 
{| class="wikitable sortable"
|-
! Year !! Title !! Role !! class="unsortable" | Notes
|-
| rowspan=2 | 2010 || In Ghost House Inn || Thomaskutty ||
|-
|| Paappi Appacha || Shashankan Muthalali ||
|-
| rowspan=4 | 2011 || Three Kings || Ashok Varma ||
|-
|| Teja Bhai and Family || Gopan ||
|-
|| Sarkar Colony || Mukundan ||
|-
|| Melvilasom || Dr. Gupta ||
|-
| rowspan=3 | 2013 || Mizhi || Santhosh ||
|-
|| Crocodile Love Story || Narayanan Namboothiri ||
|-
|| Nadodimannan || Vinayachandran ||
|-
| rowspan=2 | 2015 || Nirnayakam || Adv. Shafeer ||
|-
|| Two Countries || Mukundan ||
|-
| rowspan=4 | 2017 || Vimaanam || ||
|-
|| Careful || CI Purushothaman ||
|-
|| Ramaleela || S. P. Balachandran ||
|-
|| Pokkiri Simon || H C Yesudas ||
|-
| 2018 || Panchavarnathatha || Udayan ||
|-
| rowspan=4 | 2019 || Mikhael || Antony || 
|-
|| Oru Yamandan Premakadha || Kushumban Johnny ||
|-
|| Ittymaani: Made in China || Dr. Asif Mooppan || 
|-
|| Jack & Daniel || S.I Hari || 
|-
|}

 2020s 

Television

Serials
TamilSalanam (Vijay TV)
MalayalamSangeethika (Doordarshan)Ragamritham (doordarshan)
 Jwala (Doordarshan)Yudham(Doordarshan)
 Samayam (Asianet)
 Valayam (Doordarshan)
 Sathi (Doordarshan)
 Kadamattathu Kathanar (Asianet)
 Mahathma Gandhi colony (Surya TV)Thali (Surya TV)Sreeguruvayoorappan (Surya TV)Devimahathmyam (Asianet) CBI Diary (Mazhavil Manorama)

Reality Shows as Judge
MalayalamComedy UtsavamUrvasi Theaters''

References

External links
 
 https://web.archive.org/web/20160304064759/http://en.msidb.org/displayProfile.php?category=actors&artist=Ashokan&limit=113
 https://web.archive.org/web/20120325210925/http://popcorn.oneindia.in/artist-filmography/4904/1/ashokan.html - Ashokan filmography

Living people
Indian male voice actors
Male actors from Kerala
Male actors in Malayalam cinema
Indian male film actors
20th-century Indian male actors
21st-century Indian male actors
People from Alappuzha district
Tamil male television actors
Tamil male actors
1961 births